The Academy Award for Best Supporting Actress is an award presented annually by the Academy of Motion Picture Arts and Sciences (AMPAS). It is given to honor an actress who has delivered an outstanding performance in a supporting role while working within the film industry. The award is traditionally presented by the previous year's Best Supporting Actor winner.

At the 9th Academy Awards ceremony held in 1937, Gale Sondergaard was the first winner of this award for her role in Anthony Adverse. Initially, winners in both supporting acting categories were awarded plaques instead of statuettes. Beginning with the 16th ceremony held in 1944, winners received full-sized statuettes. Currently, nominees are determined by single transferable vote within the actors branch of AMPAS; winners are selected by a plurality vote from all eligible voting members of the Academy.

Since its inception, the award has been given to 84 actresses. Dianne Wiest and Shelley Winters have received the most awards in this category with two awards each. Despite winning no awards, Thelma Ritter was nominated on six occasions, more than any other actress. At age 10, Tatum O'Neal became the youngest actress to win this award for Paper Moon (1973), and at age 77, Peggy Ashcroft became the oldest winner in this category for A Passage to India (1984). As of the 2023 ceremony, Jamie Lee Curtis is the most recent winner in this category for her role as Deirdre Beaubeirdre in Everything Everywhere All at Once.

Winners and nominees
In the following table, the years are listed as per Academy convention, and generally correspond to the year of film release in Los Angeles County; the ceremonies are always held the following year.

1930s

1940s

1950s

1960s

1970s

1980s

1990s

2000s

2010s

2020s

Multiple wins and nominations

Individuals who received two Best Supporting Actress awards:

Individuals receiving three or more Best Supporting Actress nominations:

Age superlatives

See also
 All Academy Award acting nominees
 BAFTA Award for Best Actress in a Supporting Role
 Independent Spirit Award for Best Supporting Female
 Critics' Choice Movie Award for Best Supporting Actress
 Golden Globe Award for Best Supporting Actress – Motion Picture
 Screen Actors Guild Award for Outstanding Performance by a Female Actor in a Supporting Role

References

Bibliography

External links
 Oscars.org (official Academy site)
 Oscar.com (official ceremony promotional site)
 The Academy Awards Database (official site)

Academy Awards

Film awards for supporting actress